The Rock Flat Placer is a small placer deposit in central Idaho which is part of the Meadows Mining District. It is known to produce gold, corundum, garnet, zircon, monazite, chromite, ilmenite, magnetite, platinum, topaz, and spinel. Additionally, it is known to produce the occasional diamond, but the last one found was in the 1920s.

Meadows Mining District
Rock Flat Mine
Little Goose Creek Canyon

References 

Geology
Geology of Idaho
Mining in Idaho
Mines in Idaho
Natural history of Idaho
Adams County, Idaho